Perry Groves (born 19 April 1965) is an English former footballer, known chiefly for his time at Arsenal. He was a fast-paced player who usually played as a winger, and occasionally as a striker. Groves also played for Colchester United and Southampton. He currently works as a media pundit.

Playing career

Colchester United
Groves was born  in Bow, London, but as a boy he played for Cornard Dynamos in the village of Great Cornard on the Suffolk - Essex border. Groves then had a trial with Wolves as a schoolboy before signing as an apprentice for Colchester United in 1981. He turned professional a year later and over the next four seasons he played 142 league games for the U's, scoring 26 goals.

Arsenal
In September 1986, he signed for Arsenal for £50,000, becoming the first signing by new manager George Graham. His debut came in a goalless draw against Luton Town that same month.

In his first season at the club he helped set up Charlie Nicholas for the winner in the 1987 League Cup final, dribbling past three Liverpool players before laying the ball off.

Noted for his enthusiasm, pace and hard work, he started most of Arsenal's games in the 1987–88 season, ousting Charlie Nicholas as strike partner to Alan Smith, and helping the Gunners reach a second League Cup final the following season by scoring the only goal of the away leg of the semi-final against Everton; Arsenal however lost the final to Luton Town. Although Groves made 46 appearances in all competitions that season, the arrival of Brian Marwood reduced his opportunities to play, and he was mainly used as a substitute in Arsenal's title-winning 1988–89 season, coming off the bench 15 times during the league campaign, on top of six starts. He was on the pitch as a substitute in the final game of the season and helped create the space  when Michael Thomas famously scored the title clinching goal at Anfield.

Although an injury to Marwood opened the door for him again in 1989–90, Groves returned to the bench after Marwood recovered. This did not however stop him from winning a second league title winners' medal in 1990–91, again with most of his appearances coming as a sub, as Graham usually favoured Kevin Campbell to play alongside Alan Smith. After making only 13 league appearances in 1991–92, Groves was sold to Southampton just at the start of the inaugural Premier League season.

Southampton
He moved to Southampton in August 1992 for £750,000 but only played 15 times in two years before retiring from professional football at the age of 28, following two serious Achilles tendon injuries.

Dagenham and Redbridge
He then played four games in the Conference for Dagenham & Redbridge before ending his playing career with a solitary appearance for Canvey Island.

Post-retirement
Groves has appeared for Arsenal in several Masters footballing tournaments.
He is now a well established sports pundit and has worked for a wide variety of media firms including Sky Sports, BBC Radio 5 Live, BT Sport, Absolute Radio as well as TalkSPORT. Groves was previously part of Absolute Radio's Sony Award winning Rock 'N' Roll Football show, fronted by former Arsenal teammate, Ian Wright, which airs on a Saturday.

In 2010, Groves signed as a non-playing substitute for new club Chester after Colin Murray, then of BBC Radio 5 Live, offered the new club £2,000 if they named Groves and Pat Nevin as unused substitutes at every game in the 2010–11 season.

Legacy
Groves became a cult player among Arsenal fans, who commemorate him with the chant "We all live in a Perry Groves World", which listed Perry in every position from 1 to 12 (except 7, which is instead taken by Liam Brady), to the tune of The Beatles' "Yellow Submarine".

He still has a large following, with a fan club and website devoted to him.
In October 2006, Groves published his autobiography, entitled We All Live in a Perry Groves World. With it came an Arsenal fans' campaign on the web to purchase the book, in an attempt to outsell former Arsenal defender Ashley Cole's autobiography, My Defence, which was out at the same time. His autobiography has since outsold that of Cole.

Family
His great uncle, Vic Groves, having previously featured for Tottenham Hotspur, played for and captained Arsenal. He played as a forward making 203 appearances and scoring 37 goals.

Career statistics

Honours

Club
Arsenal
 Football League First Division: 1988–89, 1990–91
 Football League Cup: 1986–87
 Football League Centenary Trophy: 1988

References

External links

Perry Groves on arseblog.com's "arsecast" on 10 November 2006 (MP3, 17 MB)
Interview with Perry Groves in The Guardian
Soccerbase Profile

1965 births
Living people
Footballers from Bow, London
English footballers
Association football wingers
Colchester United F.C. players
Arsenal F.C. players
Southampton F.C. players
Dagenham & Redbridge F.C. players
Premier League players
English Football League players
Canvey Island F.C. players